Mary Dunn (1900–1958) was an English writer and satirist best known for the Lady Addle books.

Selected publications
Lady Addle Remembers: Being the Memoirs of the Lady Addle of Eigg (1936)	
Lady Addle at Home (1945)
The Memoirs of Mipsie (1947)Round the Year with Lady Addle (1948)The World of Lady Addle'' (1986)

References

1900 births
1958 deaths
English satirists
Women satirists
20th-century English women writers